Gaston Rousseau (14 July 1925 – 8 April 2019) was a French racing cyclist. He raced in the 1947 Tour de France.

References

External links
 

1925 births
2019 deaths
Sportspeople from Manche
French male cyclists
Cyclists from Normandy